Mohan Shakti National Heritage Park, also referred to as the Solan Heritage Park, is a modern-era Indian heritage complex in Harat, near Solan, Himachal Pradesh, India. It is about 40 kilometers south of Shimla, about 15 kilometers north of Solan, and 85 kilometers northeast of Chandigarh. Spread over 40 acres of land, it was founded by Kapil Mohan – a retired Brigadier General of the Indian Army, a Padma Shree awardee of India and an heir to the liquor-manufacturing family business Mohan Meakin Limited of Solan and Ghaziabad. The site is about 10 kilometers from the Solan "Old Monk" brewery operations of Mohan Meakin. The heritage complex costs around Rs 100 crore to build.

It is set on a hillside with a view of Himachal valley and the foothills of the Himalayas. The complex includes an expansive garden and park with a large Hindu temple at the top. The temple has two large "Om" symbols in the front, and Surya in a seven-horse chariot on the top. The temple features artwork of Hindu legends from the Vedas, the Ramayana and the Mahabharata. Motifs of Indian culture such as elephant, lion, tiger, peacock and river dolphin statues also dot the heritage park. The site includes life-size statues of famed Vedic rishis along with Hindu mythical figures and deities.

The park was inaugurated by Atal Bihari Vajpayee on Dec 01, 2002.

Gallery

References

Himachal Pradesh
Solan district
Heritage park